Kamil Čapkovič and Igor Zelenay were the defending champions, but decided not to compete.

Facundo Argüello and Ariel Behar won the title, defeating Andriej Kapaś and Błażej Koniusz in the final, 6–4, 7–6(7–4).

Seeds

Draw

Draw

References
 Main Draw

Kosice Open - Doubles
Košice Open